This is a list of songs that topped the Belgian Walloon (francophone) Ultratop 40 in 2000.

See also
2000 in music

References

External links
 Ultratop 40

2000 in Belgium
2000 record charts
2000